Schlagenheim is the debut studio album by English rock band Black Midi, released on 21 June 2019 through Rough Trade Records. The band recorded the majority of the album over a five-day period with producer Dan Carey at his studio in South London. Throughout its recording, the band made the conscious decision not to replicate their live set, embellishing their four-piece setup with synthesizers, sequencers, drum machines, banjos and organs.

Schlagenheim received praise from music critics, being nominated for the 2019 Mercury Prize and appearing inside the top-ten of several year-end lists. It also peaked at number 43 on the UK Albums Chart.

Composition
On Schlagenheim, black midi craft "cathartic" experimental rock, yielding a "surprising amalgam" of jazz fusion, math rock, noise rock and post-punk.

In 2022, drummer Morgan Simpson debunked an often-repeated rumour that the album's songs stemmed from spontaneous jam sessions: "I think there was this idea in people’s heads when we came to record the first record that it took us the same amount of time to write the actual song itself that it did to record it. That just was never true."

Before settling on the title Schlagenheim, vocalist and guitarist Geordie Greep wanted to call the album Hellfire, which ultimately became the name of their third studio album.

Reception

At Metacritic, which assigns a weighted mean rating out of 100 to reviews from mainstream publications, Schlagenheim received a score of 82, based on 20 reviews, indicating "universal acclaim". Paul Glynn of the BBC claimed that the album "has been described by critics as everything from thrilling to frustrating." Schlagenheim was praised for the technical proficiency of the musicianship, with Paste, Pitchfork, Tiny Mix Tapes and The Guardian singling out Simpson's drumming as especially good.

In a positive review for Paste, Steven Edelstone says that Greep and Kwasniewski-Kelvin are "two of our most inventive contemporary guitarists" but that one of the few faults of Schlagenheim is that it doesn't "showcase Morgan Simpson’s frenzied drumming to its fullest extent." Edelstone praises Schlagenheim's unpredictability stating "Schlagenheim surprises at every turn, never settling into a predictable flow" later comparing it to Trout Mask Replica opining that like that album "it doesn’t always sound aurally pleasing, and it’s often tough to keep up, but it rewards those who try." Edelstone says that Schlagenheim is "one of the best albums [he had] ever heard" and "a masterpiece".

In a mixed review for The Guardian, Alexis Petridis praises moments of technical virtuosity in which the band "lock into a groove that manages to be hypnotically repetitious while constantly shifting and changing" but also said of the band "at their least appealing, there’s no doubt that Black Midi can sound pretty pleased with themselves [...] it’s hard to avoid a sensation of po-faced seriousness, of music that exists largely in order to make its authors and fans feel superior". Petridis concludes "Schlagenheim is an imperfect, intriguing debut: behind the overheated prose lurks a young, self-conscious band who clearly aren’t as fully formed as the hype suggests [...] for all its flaws, Schlagenheim is promising enough to suggest that watching them develop could be fascinating." Joshua Copperman of PopMatters says that although "on talent alone, Black Midi exceeds the hype" they are "technically proficient but emotionally shallow". Copperman cites "Of Schlagenheim" as an example of this stating that the track "bounces between atmospheric interludes and unhinged screeching but does both extremes no favors. There are so many ideas [...] that they cancel each other out." He calls Schlagenheim "both the most promising and exasperating record of 2019."

Year-end rankings

Track listing

Personnel
Sourced from the Albums Liner Notes and AllMusic.

Black Midi
 Geordie Greep – vocals , Reverend Descend Baritone guitar , Gretsch Spectrasonic Baritone guitar  
 Matt Kwasniewski-Kelvin – vocals , 1996 Fender Mustang guitar , Fender Telecaster guitar , Fender Thinline Telecaster guitar , Supro Val Trol guitar , Gretsch Falcon guitar 
 Cameron Picton – vocals , Gretsch White Falcon bass , Eastwood Sidejack Bass 32 , Fender Jazz bass , Gibson EB 2 bass , Rickernbacker 4003 bass  Fender Mustang bass 
 Morgan Simpson – Rogers drum set , Ludwig Black Beauty snare drum , Craviotto Timeless Timber snare drum , Meinl cymbals 
 Katie Sherrard – additional vocals  
 "Overdubs" (not credited to the Band Members) – Rickenbacker 4003 Bass 50p , Fender Telecaster , Fender Mustang , nylon acoustic guitar , modular synth , Swarmatron , Nashville Strung Electric Guitar , bells , tambourine , finger cymbals , guiro , bongos , Kawai Upright Piano , Russian guitar , wah-wah guitar , Fender Mustang Bass , Buchla Music Easel , Dave Smith Prophet 2 , Gibson Kalamzoo , Deckard's Dream , Mellotron , Roland Jupiter 8 , tack tom , MPC X , clavioline  Simon & Patrick Acoustic Guitar , Fratelli Crosio Chromatic Accordion , flute , pedal steel , guitarron bass , banjo , bin lid , cowbell , block , spring , shaker , tambo , triangle , Nashville Strung Acoustic Guitar , Nashville Springing , Gretsch Black Falcon , claps , giant spring , Fender Rhodes , MPC X with Buchla samples , Rickenbacker 360 , shouts , Supro Val Trol , rain stick , castanets , Roland System 100 , Roland SP 404 
Production
 Dan Carey – production
 Alexis Smith – engineering
 Christian Wright – mastering
 David Rudnick – artwork

Charts

References
Notes

References

2019 debut albums
Rough Trade Records albums
Albums produced by Dan Carey (record producer)
Black Midi albums